Disepalum is a genus of plants in the family Annonaceae and tribe Annoneae.  

Species have been recorded from southern China, Indo-China and Malesia.

Species 
Plants of the World Online currently includes:
 Disepalum aciculare  D.M.Johnson
 Disepalum acuminatissimum  Boerl. & Koord.-Schum.
 Disepalum anomalum  Hook.f. - type species
 Disepalum coronatum  Becc.
 Disepalum longipes  King
 Disepalum petelotii  (Merr.) D.M.Johnson
 Disepalum plagioneurum  (Diels) D.M.Johnson
 Disepalum platypetalum  Merr.
 Disepalum pulchrum (King) J.Sinclair

References

External links 
 

Annonaceae genera
Annonaceae
Taxa named by Joseph Dalton Hooker